Felix McDonald (born 26 June 1954) is a Guatemalan former footballer. He competed in the men's tournament at the 1976 Summer Olympics.

References

External links
 
 

1954 births
Living people
Guatemalan footballers
Guatemala international footballers
Olympic footballers of Guatemala
Footballers at the 1976 Summer Olympics
Comunicaciones F.C. players
Place of birth missing (living people)
Association football midfielders
C.S.D. Galcasa players
C.S.D. Municipal players